Ed Reed was coach of Brown University’s water polo team from 1971 to 1992 (it held varsity status from 1974 to the end of his tenure).  Initially, he was also head coach of the varsity swim team.

Accomplishments 
As an undergraduate at Springfield College, Reed was a two-time All-American in swimming.  At the 1965 New England Intercollegiate Championships he won the 200 Individual Medley.  Coaching water polo at Brown, Reed achieved an impressive record of 420 wins, 159 losses, and 5 ties, holding a winning record in all seasons.  He also won seventeen New England Championships in a row in addition to four Eastern Championships (three of those consecutively).  His team went to the Eastern Championship ten times, and the NCAA tournament eleven. In 1983, 1984, and 1985, Brown University placed 6th at the NCAA tournament under his auspices.  Seventeen of his players earned All-American honors.  Reed was named Eastern Water Polo League Coach of the Year in 1987 and 1989.  He is a member of the Rhode Island Aquatic Hall of Fame (inducted 1986), Brown University Athletic Hall of Fame (1996), and the United States Water Polo Hall of fame (1999).

Positions 
Reed initially coached swimming for Tufts University following his graduation from Springfield College.  In 1971 he began coaching both swimming and water polo at Brown University where he stayed until 1994.  Reed was a member of the coaching staff for the United States Men's National Water Polo Team from 1993 to 1996.  He was elected president of the American Water Polo Coaches Association, and served on committees for United States Water Polo.  Reed was appointed interim-coach  at the University of Alabama for the 1994–1995 season, and then became the Aquatic Center Manager for the university's pool.  He coached Alabama's club team for several years, before his involvement with Collegiate Water Polo Association led him to be named a member of the Technical Committee for the CWPA where he evaluates and selects officials for the league.

References
 Edward W. "Ed" Reed Jr. – Class of 1999. USA Water Polo, Inc. Accessed 2011-01-17.
 2003 – Ed Reed – Brown University. Collegiate Water Polo Association. Accessed 2011-01-17.

Living people
American male water polo players
Alabama Crimson Tide swimming coaches
Brown Bears swimming coaches
Brown Bears men's water polo coaches
Springfield Pride men's swimmers
Tufts Jumbos swimming coaches
Year of birth missing (living people)